One Step Closer is the ninth studio album by American rock band The Doobie Brothers. The album was released on September 17, 1980, by Warner Bros. Records. The album included the hit "Real Love", which reached #5 on the Billboard Hot 100. This album is the band's last studio album with Michael McDonald in the lineup until 2014's Southbound, and also the first studio album to feature John McFee as a member of the band.

Track listing

Personnel
The Doobie Brothers
Patrick Simmons – guitars, lead and backing vocals
John McFee – guitars, backing vocals
Michael McDonald – keyboards, synthesizers, lead and backing vocals
Cornelius Bumpus – tenor saxophone, soprano saxophone, organ, lead and backing vocals
Tiran Porter – bass
Keith Knudsen – drums, backing vocals
Chet McCracken – drums, vibraphone, marimbas

Additional personnel
Bobby LaKind – congas, bongos, backing vocals
Nicolette Larson – backing vocals on "Real Love", "Dedicate This Heart", and "Just In Time"
Patrick Henderson – keyboards on "Real Love", "One By One", and "Keep This Train A-Rollin'"
Lee Thornburg – trumpet on "South Bay Strut" and "Keep This Train A-Rollin'", flugelhorn for "Dedicate This Heart"
Chris Thompson – backing vocals on "No Stoppin' Us Now"
Ted Templeman – tambourine, cowbell, maracas, backing vocals on "One Step Closer"
Jerome Jumonville – tenor saxophone, horn arrangements on "Keep This Train A-Rollin'"
Joel Peskin – baritone saxophone on "Keep This Train A-Rollin'"
Bill Armstrong – trumpet on "Keep This Train A-Rollin'"
Jimmie Haskell – string arrangements on "Real Love" and "South Bay Strut"

Production
Producer – Ted Templeman
Production Assistant – Joan Parker
Production Coordination – Susyn Schope
Engineer – James Isaacson
Second Engineer – Gene Meros
Mastering – Kent Duncan and Tim Dennan at Kendun Recorders (Burbank, CA).
Photography – Norman Seeff
Art Direction and Design – Jim Welch
Management – Bruce Cohn

Charts

References

1980 albums
The Doobie Brothers albums
Albums arranged by Jimmie Haskell
Albums produced by Ted Templeman
Warner Records albums
Albums recorded at Sunset Sound Recorders